Centric Holdings S.A, also known as Centric, is a Greek public company, trading in the ATHEX since 2002. Its 2015 Financial Year turnover stood at circa €859m.

History

Centric was founded in 1995 under the trading name "Group Multimedia Systems S.A." and it specialized in the production and distribution of digital products and home entertainment services.

Since its inception the company expanded its operations in the digital gaming industry, representing and distributing game consoles, computer games, online games and computer and gaming console peripherals in the Greek Market. In 2001, Centric signed an agreement with Microsoft for the distribution of the Xbox gaming console in Greece, establishing its position in the digital home entertainment market.

In 2002 Centric was listed in [ATHEX] for public trading.

Due to the intense competition and the illegal software copying ("piracy") of gaming software, which ultimately suppressed gross profit margins and have therefore restrained long-term growth prospects for the digital home entertainment industry, Centric decided to explore different investment opportunities in order to enhance its presence in the digital entertainment industry. Hence in 2007 the company decided to focus on the integration of online services capitalizing on its vast experience on the business.

The online entertainment companies at the time were offering a combination of traditional services such as sportsbook, casino, poker and several soft games.

Therefore, in 2007 Centric started shifting its investments in areas with better growth prospects in order to boost its financial performance. The company acquired 21% of ECN Management Ltd, a company that owns the VistaΒet.com  site. In addition Centric acquired 100% of Flyer S.A., which was the marketing partner of Sportingbet Plc for the provision of its online entertainment services in the Greek language.

Expanding partnerships and present

In 2008 Centric raised its stake in ECN Management Ltd to a total of 51% further enhancing its position in the online entertainment market.

The company gradually distanced itself from the activity of the distribution of digital content and in 2011 has decided to discontinue it. Further, in 2012 under a decision of the General Meeting of its shareholders, Centric has changed its name from Centric Multimedia to Centric Holdings, trusting that the new name depicts better and more accurately its current activities. Centric core activity is still  to participate in online entertainment industry companies. Its subsidiaries cooperate with Sportingbet Plc, now a subsidiary of Gaming VC, in the exploitation of "Sportingbet" and "VistaBet" brands. Additionally, Centric owns minority stakes in companies that are active in the shipping industry and it is also active in the Renewable Energy Sector.

See also
1453–1821: The Coming of Liberation

References
 Centric Website
 p&L data
 balance sheet

Entertainment companies of Greece
Companies listed on the Athens Exchange